This is a list of military aircraft used by the Central Powers in World War I

Austro-Hungarian aircraft
Built specifically for or in Austria-Hungary, whose designation system was based on the German one, but with duplications for unrelated designs. German designs used by Austria-Hungary and Germany are in German section.

A & B types  (unarmed monoplanes and biplanes)
 Aviatik B.III (1916)
 Etrich Taube (1911)
 Fokker B.I (1915)
 Fokker B.II (1916)
 Fokker B.III – reconnaissance/fighter
 Hansa-Brandenburg B.I (1914)
 Lohner B.I (1912)
 Lohner B.II (1913)
 Lohner B.III
 Lohner B.IV
 Lohner B.V
 Lohner B.VI
 Lohner B.VII (1915)

C types (armed two seat biplanes)
 Aviatik (Ö) C.I (1916)
 Hansa-Brandenburg C.I
 Knoller C.I (1916)
 Knoller C.II (1916)
 Lloyd C.I (1914)
 Lloyd C.II (1915)
 Lloyd C.III
 Lloyd C.IV
 Lloyd C.V (1917)
 Lohner C.I (1916)
 Phonix C.I (1918)

D types (Doppeldecker – armed single seaters)
 Aviatik (Berg) D.I (1917)
 Aviatik (Berg) D.II (1917)
 Hansa-Brandenburg D.I (1916)
 Phönix D.I (1917)
 Phönix D.II
 Phönix D.III
 Fokker Dr.I triplane

G types (Grossflugzeuge – large bombers)
 Hansa-Brandenburg G.I (1917)

Seaplanes
 Lohner L (1915)
 Hansa-Brandenburg CC (1916)
 Hansa-Brandenburg W.13

Bulgarian aircraft
Lacking an indigenous aviation industry capable of producing military aircraft, Bulgaria primarily relied on Germany for aircraft.

German aircraft

A & B types (unarmed monoplanes and biplanes)
 AEG B.I (1914)
 AEG B.II (1914)
 AEG B.III (1915)
 Albatros B.I (1913)
 Albatros B.II (1914)
 Albatros B.III (1915)
 Aviatik B.I (1914)
 Aviatik B.II (1914)
 BFW Monoplane 1918
 DFW B.I (1914)
 DFW B.II
 DFW Mars (1913)
 Euler B.I
 Euler B.II
 Euler B.III
 Fokker A.I
 Fokker A.II
 Fokker A.III (1915)
 Fokker M.7
 Germania type B (1915)
 Gödecker B type
 Gotha LD.1/2/6/7
 Gotha LD.5
 Gotha LE.3 Taube
 Halberstadt type B
 Halberstadt B.I
 Halberstadt B.II
 Halberstadt B.III
 Hannuschke monoplane (1915)
 Jeannin Taube (1914)
 Jeannin biplane (1915)
 LVG B.I
 LVG B.II
 LVG B.III
 NFW B.I
 Otto pusher (1914)
 Otto B.I (1914)
 Pfalz A.I & A.II (license-built Morane-Saulnier L)
 Rumpler Taube (1911)
 Rumpler 4A/B.I
 Sablatnig B.I

C types (armed two seat biplanes)
 AEG C.I (1915)
 AEG C.II (1915)
 AEG C.III
 AEG C.IV
 AEG C.V
 AEG C.VI
 AEG C.VII
 AEG C.VIII
 AEG C.VIII Dr – reconnaissance triplane
 AGO C.I
 AGO C.II
 AGO C.III
 AGO C.IV
 AGO C.VII
 AGO C.VIII
 Albatros C.I (1915)
 Albatros C.II
 Albatros C.III (1916)
 Albatros C.IV
 Albatros C.V
 Albatros C.VI
 Albatros C.VII
 Albatros C.VIII
 Albatros C.IX
 Albatros C.X
 Albatros C.XII
 Albatros C.XIII
 Albatros C.XIV
 Albatros C.XV
 Aviatik C.I (1916)
 Aviatik C.II
 Aviatik C.III
 Aviatik C.V
 Aviatik C.VI
 Aviatik C.VII
 Aviatik C.VIII
 Aviatik C.IX
 DFW C.I
 DFW C.II
 DFW C.IV
 DFW C.V
 DFW C.VI
 Euler C
 Fokker C.I
 Friedrichshafen C.I
 Germania C.I
 Germania C.II
 Germania C.IV
 Halberstadt C.I
 Halberstadt C.III
 Halberstadt C.V
 Halberstadt C.VII
 Halberstadt C.VIII
 Halberstadt C.IX
 Hannover C.I (license-built Aviatik C.I)
 LFG Roland C.II (1916)
 LFG Roland C.III
 LFG Roland C.V
 LFG Roland C.VIII
 LVG C.I
 LVG C.II (1916)
 LVG C.III
 LVG C.IV
 LVG C.V
 LVG C.VI
 LVG C.VII
 LVG C.VIII
 LVG C.IX
 Otto C.I (1915)
 Otto C.II
 Pfalz C.I (license-built Rumpler C.IV)
 Rumpler C.I & Ia
 Rumpler C.III
 Rumpler C.IV
 Rumpler C.V
 Rumpler C.VI
 Rumpler C.VII
 Rumpler C.VIII
 Rumpler C.IX
 Rumpler C.X
 Sablatnig C.I
 Sablatnig C.II
 Sablatnig C.III

CL types (close support & two seat fighters)
 BFW CL.I
 BFW CL.II
 BFW CL.III
 Daimler CL.I
 Halberstadt CL.II
 Halberstadt CL.IV
 Halberstadt CLS.I
 Hannover CL.II
 Hannover CL.III
 Hannover CL.IV
 Hannover CL.V
 Junkers CL.I (1917)

D types (Doppeldecker – armed single seaters)
 AEG D.I (1917)
 AGO DV.3 (1915)
 Albatros D.I (1916)
 Albatros D.II (1916)
 Albatros D.III (1916)
 Albatros D.IV (1916)
 Albatros D.V & Va (1917)
 Albatros D.VI
 Albatros D.VII
 Albatros D.VIII
 Albatros D.IX (1918)
 Albatros D.X
 Albatros D.XI (1918)
 Albatros D.XII (1918)
 Aviatik D.I (license-built Halberstadt D.II)
 Aviatik D.II (1916)
 Aviatik D.III (1917)
 Aviatik D.IV
 Aviatik D.V
 Aviatik D.VI (1918)
 Aviatik D.VII (1918)
 Caspar D.I
 Daimler D.I (1918)
 Daimler D.II
 DFW D.I
 DFW D.II
 Euler D.I (1916)(copy of Nieuport)
 Euler D.II
 Fokker D.I (1916)
 Fokker D.II (1916)
 Fokker D.III (1916)
 Fokker D.IV (1916)
 Fokker D.V (1916)
 Fokker D.VI (1918)
 Fokker D.VII (1918)
 Fokker D.VIII (monoplane originally E.V) (1918)
 Friedrichshafen D.I
 Friedrichshafen D.II
 Germania type C/K.D.D.
 Halberstadt D.I
 Halberstadt D.II (1915)
 Halberstadt D.III (1916)
 Halberstadt D.IV
 Halberstadt D.V (1916)
 Junkers D.I (1918)
 Kondor D.6 (1918)
 Kondor D.7 (1918)
 LFG Roland D.I (1916)
 LFG Roland D.II & IIa (1916)
 LFG Roland D.III (1916)
 LFG Roland D.IV (also designated Dr.I) (1917)
 LFG Roland D.V
 LFG Roland D.VI (1917)
 LFG Roland D.VII (1918)
 LFG Roland D.VIII (1918)
 LFG Roland D.IX (1917)
 LFG Roland D.XIII
 LFG Roland D.XIV
 LFG Roland D.XV (1918)
 LFG Roland D.XVI (1918)
 LFG Roland D.XVII (1918)
 LVG D.II
 LVG D.III
 LVG D.IV
 LVG D.V
 LVG D.VI
 Märkische D.I
 Naglo D.II (1918)
 Pfalz D type
 Pfalz D.I (license-built LFG Roland D.I) (1916)
 Pfalz D.II & IIa (license-built LFG Roland D.II) (1916)
 Pfalz D.III & IIIa (1917)
 Pfalz D.IV
 Pfalz D.VI (1917)
 Pfalz D.VII (1917)
 Pfalz D.VIII (1918)
 Pfalz D.XII (1918)
 Pfalz D.XIV
 Pfalz D.XV (1918)
 Rumpler D.I
 Siemens-Schuckert D.I (1916)
 Siemens-Schuckert D.III (1918)
 Siemens-Schuckert D.IV (1918)
 Zeppelin-Lindau D.I (1918)

Dr & F types (Dreidecker – triplane fighters)
 AEG Dr.I (1917)
 Albatros Dr.I
 Albatros Dr.II
 Aviatik Dr.I
 DFW Dr.I
 Euler Dr.I
 Fokker Dr.I (also designated F.I) (1917)
 Pfalz Dr.I (1917)
 Pfalz Dr.II (1918)
 Siemens-Schuckert DDr.I (1917)

E types (Eindecker – armed monoplanes)
 Fokker E.I (1915)
 Fokker E.II (1915)
 Fokker E.III (1916)
 Fokker E.IV (1916)
 Fokker E.V (later redesignated D.VIII)
 Junkers E.I (1916)
 Kondor E.III (1918)
 LVG E.I (reconnaissance monoplane) (1915)
 NFW E.I
 NFW E.II (1917)
 Pfalz E.I (1915)
 Pfalz E.II (1915)
 Pfalz E.III (converted Pfalz A.II) (1916)
 Pfalz E.IV (1915)
 Pfalz E.V (1916)
 Pfalz E.VI (1916)

G & K types (Grossflugzeuge – large bombers, originally Kampfflugzeuge – battleplane)
 AEG G.I/K.I (1915)
 AEG G.II (1915)
 AEG G.III (1915)
 AEG G.IV (1916)
 AEG G.V (1918)
 Albatros G.I (1916)
 Albatros G.II (1916)
 Albatros G.III (1916)
 Aviatik G.I
 Aviatik G.III
 Fokker K.I
 Friedrichshafen G.I (1915)
 Friedrichshafen G.II (1916)
 Friedrichshafen G.III & IIIa (1917)
 Friedrichshafen G.IV (1918)
 Friedrichshafen G.V (1918)
 Gotha G.I (1915)
 Gotha G.II (1916)
 Gotha G.III (1916)
 Gotha G.IV (1916)
 Gotha G.V (1917)
 Gotha G.VI (1918)
 Gotha G.VII/GL.VII (1918)
 Gotha G.VIII/GL.VIII (1918)
 Gotha G.IX (1918)
 Gotha G.X (1918)
 Halberstadt G.I
 LFG Roland G.I
 LVG G.I
 LVG G.II
 LVG G.III (aka Schütte-Lanz G.V) (1918)
 Rumpler G.I (1915)
 Rumpler G.II
 Rumpler G.III
 Schütte-Lanz G.I (1915)
 Schütte-Lanz G.V (aka LVG G.III)
 Siemens-Schuckert Forssman (1915)

J types (ground attack)
 AEG PE (1918)
 AEG DJ.I
 AEG J.I (1916)
 AEG J.II (1918)
 AGO S.I (1918?)
 Albatros J.I
 Albatros J.II
 Albatros J.III
 Junkers CL.I (1918)
 Junkers J.I

L types (bombers)
 Siemens-Schuckert L.I (1918)

N types (nachtflugzeuge – night bombers)
 AEG C.IVN
 AEG N.I (1917)
 Albatros C.VIII N
 Albatros N.I (C.VII variant)
 BFW N.I
 Friedrichshafen N.I
 Sablatnig N.I

R types (Riesenflugzeuge – giant bombers)

 AEG R.I (1916)
 Aviatik R.III
 DFW R.I (1916)
 DFW R.II (1918)
 Linke-Hofmann R.I (1917)
 Linke-Hofmann R.II (1919)
 Siemens-Schuckert R.I (1915)
 Siemens-Schuckert R.II (1915)
 Siemens-Schuckert R.III (1915)
 Siemens-Schuckert R.IV (1916)
 Siemens-Schuckert R.V (1916)
 Siemens-Schuckert R.VI (1916)
 Siemens-Schuckert R.VII (1917)
 Siemens-Schuckert R.VIII (did not fly)
 Zeppelin-Staaken V.G.O.I (1915)
 Zeppelin-Staaken V.G.O.II (1915)
 Zeppelin-Staaken V.G.O.III (1915)
 Zeppelin-Staaken R.IV (1915)
 Zeppelin-Staaken R.V (1915)
 Zeppelin-Staaken R.VI (1916)
 Zeppelin-Staaken R.VII (1917)
 Zeppelin-Staaken R.XIV (1918)
 Zeppelin-Staaken R.XV (1918)
 Zeppelin-Staaken R.XVI (1918)
 Zeppelin-Lindau Rs.I (did not fly)
 Zeppelin-Lindau Rs.II (1916)
 Zeppelin-Lindau Rs.III (1917)
 Zeppelin-Lindau Rs.IV (1918)

W types and other seaplanes (Wasser – floatplane)
 Albatros W.1 (reconnaissance)
 Albatros W.2 (reconnaissance)
 Albatros W.3 (torpedo bomber)
 Albatros W.4 (1916)(fighter)
 Albatros W.5 (torpedo bomber)
 Albatros W.8 (1918)(fighter)
 Caspar U.1 (U-boat aircraft)
 Friedrichshafen FF.33 (reconnaissance)
 Friedrichshafen FF.49 (reconnaissance)
 Gotha WD.1 (reconnaissance)
 Gotha WD.2/5/9/12/13/15 (reconnaissance)
 Gotha WD.3 (reconnaissance)
 Gotha WD.7 (reconnaissance)
 Gotha WD.8 (reconnaissance)
 Gotha WD.11 (torpedo bomber)
 Gotha WD.14/20/22 (torpedo bombers)
 Gotha WD.27 (reconnaissance)
 Hansa-Brandenburg FB
 Hansa-Brandenburg GDW (torpedo bomber)
 Hansa-Brandenburg GNW (reconnaissance)
 Hansa-Brandenburg GW (torpedo bomber)
 Hansa-Brandenburg KW (reconnaissance)
 Hansa-Brandenburg KDW (fighter)
 Hansa-Brandenburg LW (reconnaissance)
 Hansa-Brandenburg NW (reconnaissance)
 Hansa-Brandenburg W (reconnaissance)
 Hansa-Brandenburg W.11 (fighter)
 Hansa-Brandenburg W.12 (1917)(fighter)
 Hansa-Brandenburg W.19 (reconnaissance)
 Hansa-Brandenburg W.20 (fighter)
 Hansa-Brandenburg W.27 (fighter)
 Hansa-Brandenburg W.29 (1918)(fighter)
 Hansa-Brandenburg W.32 (fighter)
 Hansa-Brandenburg W.33 (fighter)
 Junkers CLS.I (fighter)
 Kaiserliche Werft Danzig 404 (trainer)
 Kaiserliche Werft Danzig 467 (trainer)
 Kaiserliche Werft Danzig 1105 (trainer)
 Kaiserliche Werft Danzig 1650 (reconnaissance)
 Kaiserliche Werft Kiel 463 (trainer)
 Kaiserliche Werft Wilhelmshaven 401 (trainer)
 Kaiserliche Werft Wilhelmshaven 461 (trainer)
 Kaiserliche Werft Wilhelmshaven 945 (fighter)
 Kaiserliche Werft Wilhelmshaven 947 (reconnaissance)
 LFG Roland WD (1917)(fighter)
 LFG Roland W (reconnaissance)
 Lübeck-Travemünde F.1 (reconnaissance)
 Lübeck-Travemünde F.2 (reconnaissance)
 Lübeck-Travemünde F.3/844 (fighter)
 Lübeck-Travemünde F.4 (reconnaissance)
 Oertz W 4
 Oertz W 5
 Oertz W 6
 Oertz W 7
 Oertz W 8
 Rumpler 4E (1914)
 Rumpler 6B (1916)(fighter/reconnaissance)
 Sablatnig SF-1 (reconnaissance)
 Sablatnig SF-2 (reconnaissance)
 Sablatnig SF-3 (fighter)
 Sablatnig SF-4 (fighter)
 Sablatnig SF-5 (reconnaissance)
 Sablatnig SF-7 (fighter)
 Sablatnig SF-8 (trainer)

Experimental
 Albatros C.II
 Albatros L 3 (single seat reconnaissance)
 Albatros L 9 (single seat reconnaissance)
 Alter Type AI – fighter
 Daimler L8 (fighter)
 Daimler L9 (fighter)
 Daimler L11 (fighter)
 Daimler L14 (fighter)
 DFW T.28 Floh (fighter)
 Euler D (fighter)
 Euler Dr.2 (fighter)
 Euler Dr.3 (fighter)
 Euler Dr.4 (fighter)
 Euler Pusher Einsitzer (fighter)
 Euler Quadruplane (fighter)
 Fokker M.6 (1914)
 Fokker V.1 (1916) (fighter)
 Fokker V.2 (fighter)
 Fokker V.8 (5 wing fighter)
 Fokker V.9 (fighter)
 Fokker V.17 (fighter)
 Fokker V.20 (fighter)
 Fokker V.23 (fighter)
 Fokker V.25 (fighter)
 Fokker V.27 (fighter)
 Germania JM (1916) (unarmed single seater)
 Hansa-Brandenburg L.14 (fighter)
 Hansa-Brandenburg L.16 (fighter)
 Junkers J 1 (1915) (first all-metal aircraft)
 Junkers J 2/E.I (1916)
 LFG V 19 Straslund (submarine aircraft)
 Rex 1915 Scout (1915)
 Rex 1916 Scout (1916)
 Rex 1917 Scout (1917)
 Rumpler 7D (fighter)
 Siemens-Schuckert D.II (1917)(experimental)
 Siemens-Schuckert L.I (1918)
 Zeppelin-Lindau (Dornier) V1 (1916)

Ottoman aircraft
Lacking an indigenous aviation industry, the Ottoman Empire primarily relied on Germany for aircraft, although a number of French pre-war aircraft were used in the early part of the war. The Ottoman Empire also operated two Avro 504 light fighter reconnaissance aircraft. Later on, they were used as trainer aircraft

See also
 Idflieg aircraft designation system
 List of military aircraft of Germany
 List of World War I Entente aircraft

References

Notes

Citations

Bibliography

 
 
 
 
 
 

 
Central Powers aircraft
Central Powers aircraft
Military aircraft of Germany, List of
Germany, List of military aircraft of
Austro-Hungarian military-related lists
German military-related lists
Aircraft of Germany, List of military
Central Powers aircraft